Joseph Valentine Stripp (February 3, 1903 – June 10, 1989) was an American professional baseball third baseman. He played in Major League Baseball (MLB) for the Cincinnati Reds, Brooklyn Dodgers, St. Louis Cardinals, and Boston Bees between 1928 and 1938. Stripp hit .300 or better 6 times, with a career best .324 with the Reds in 1931.

In 1146 games over 11 seasons, Stripp posted a .294 batting average (1238-for-4211) with 575 runs, 219 doubles, 43 triples, 24 home runs, 464 RBI, 50 stolen bases, 280 bases on balls, .340 on-base percentage and .384 slugging percentage. He finished his career with a .972 fielding percentage playing primarily at first and third base.

He died, aged 86, in Orlando, Florida.

References

External links

1903 births
1989 deaths
Major League Baseball third basemen
Baseball players from New Jersey
Cincinnati Reds players
St. Louis Cardinals players
Boston Bees players
Brooklyn Dodgers players
People from Harrison, New Jersey
Danville Tobacconists players
Charlotte Hornets (baseball) players
Columbus Senators players
Sportspeople from Hudson County, New Jersey